Roberto Enrique Vargas Vélez (May 29, 1929 – May 27, 2014) was a pitcher in Major League Baseball who played for the Milwaukee Braves of the National League during the 1955 season. Listed at 5' 11", Weight: 170 lb., Vargas batted and threw left handed. He was born in Santurce, Puerto Rico.

Vargas was among the first ten Puerto Rican ball players to debut in the major leagues, making his first appearance for Milwaukee on April 17, 1955, the same day as fellow Boricua Roberto Clemente did it with the Pittsburgh Pirates.

He made 25 relief appearances for the Braves, allowing 23 earned runs on 39 hits and 14 walks for an 8.76 ERA, while striking out 13 in 24⅔ innings of work and did not have a decision.

Sent back to the minors midway through the season, Vargas, who had pitched for the Chicago American Giants of the Negro American League in 1948, performed for 11 teams in eight different leagues in a span of eight seasons from 1949–1960.

Besides, he played four years in the Mexican League as well as winter baseball at Puerto Rico between 1947 and 1961, while representing his country several times in the Caribbean Series tournament.

Eventually, Vargas had a long career coaching and managing in the Puerto Rico winter league. There, he advised young pitching prospects about the importance of throwing first-pitch strikes and pounding the strike zone and jamming hitters.

Vargas died in 2014 in Caguas, Puerto Rico, two days short of his 85th birthday.

See also
 List of Negro league baseball players who played in Major League Baseball

References

External links
 and Seamheads
Mexican League statistics
Retrosheet

1929 births
2014 deaths
Charros de Jalisco players
Chicago American Giants players
Drummondville Cubs players
Houston Buffs players
Lakeland Pilots players
Macon Dodgers players
Major League Baseball pitchers
Major League Baseball players from Puerto Rico
Memphis Red Sox players
Mexican League baseball pitchers
Milwaukee Braves players
Montreal Royals players
People from Santurce, Puerto Rico
Petroleros de Poza Rica players
Puerto Rican expatriate baseball players in Canada
Puerto Rican expatriate baseball players in Mexico
Reading Indians players
Sportspeople from San Juan, Puerto Rico
Victoria Rosebuds players
Wichita Braves players
20th-century African-American sportspeople